On roadways around the United States, Radio-frequency identification (RFID) transponders, supporting transceivers, antennas, and video cameras are the current standard for the collection of toll fees. This technology was invented during the 1970s and was implemented throughout the 1980s and 1990s. Today, the fastest growing payment technologies center around smart phones. These devices are beginning to permit tolling authorities new channels of toll collection and communication with drivers. There are a number of mobile applications that are available for drivers to use as a way to manage their toll accounts as well as  applications that actually allow the consumer to pay tolls from their smart phone.

Toll Applications

Uproad 
Application Name: Uproad
Roadways: Available for toll roads in: California, Delaware, Florida, Illinois, Indiana, Kansas, Kentucky, Maine, Maryland, Massachusetts, New Hampshire, New Jersey, New York, North Carolina, Oklahoma, Pennsylvania, Virginia, Texas, and West Virginia.
Capabilities: Allows you to pay for tolls on your personal or rental cars, commercial vehicles, and motorcycles. Use the app to manage up to 10 vehicles, track your toll expenses, plan your trips, monitor pending toll charges, and offset your carbon footprint with a single account. Offers violation protection to protect against toll authority violation tickets. Owned by parent company Kapsch. Offers a pay-as-you-go option and memberships.

Ecotoll 
Application Name: Ecotoll
Roadways: Available for toll roads in: California, Delaware, Florida, Ohio, North Carolina, Illinois, Indiana, Kansas, Kentucky, Maine, Maryland, Massachusetts, Minnesota, New Hampshire, New Jersey, New York, Virginia and West Virginia.
Capabilities: Allows you to pay for tolls on your personal or rental cars, and motorcycles. Use the app to track your toll expenses, plan your trips, and offset your carbon footprint with a single account.

Peasy 
Application Name: Peasy
Roadways: Available for toll roads in: California, Colorado, Delaware, Florida, Georgia, Illinois, Kansas, Kentucky, Massachusetts, Maryland, Maine, North Carolina, New Hampshire, New Jersey, New York, Texas, Virginia, Washington and West Virginia.
Capabilities: Allows users with or without a transponder device or a toll account to register vehicles for toll coverage with no pre-funding requirements. Automatically pays tolls via a credit card. A mobile phone is not required for toll location validation. Eliminates missed payments, violations, toll fines and penalties while using approved toll ways.

Tollmate
Application Name: Tollmate
Toll Authority: North Texas Toll Authority
Capabilities: Gives users the ability to log into their transponder accounts and view history, add money to their balance, contact customer service, and calculate toll fees
Update:  In May 2016 the app received an update that now provides push notification to help users manager their toll tag account

TEXpress
Application Name: TEXpress
Toll Authority: North Texas Toll Authority
Capabilities: Gives users the ability to create accounts and registers vehicles to their toll tag account

BancPass
Application Name: PlusPass
Toll Authority: All toll roads in Texas, Georgia and the State of Washington, agreements pending with E-Z Pass system(s), Colorado and California Agencies
Roadways:  All toll roads in Texas, Florida and Washington State
Capabilities: Provides the ability for users to add their vehicle information and pay tolls.
Patents: Awarded patent #9,691,061 "System for Electronic Toll Payment". Additional patents pending.

FastToll
Application Name: FastToll
Toll Authority: None
Roadways:  Illinois Tollways
Capabilities: FastToll allows users to track tolls on the Illinois Tollway roads. The tolls can be then paid through the app within 7 days. The app issues reminders ensuring that tolls are paid timely. Available on both Android and Apple iOS platforms.

IPass Manager
Application Name: IPass Manager
Toll Authority: None
Roadways:  Illinois Tollways
Capabilities: Allows users to manage their Illinois I-PASS toll transponder account. I-Pass Manager users may check their balance, add funds, view their toll history, and manage credit card or vehicle information.  Available on both Android and Apple iOS platforms.

PayTollo
Application Name: PayTollo
Toll Authority: Agreement with Central Florida Expressway
Roadways:  The state of Florida, Georgia,  North Carolina, Orange County (TCA) California.
Capabilities: Provides users the ability to register a vehicle, use the phone's GPS to observe toll crossings, allow real time payment, avoid the pay by mail system for tolls crossed without their phone and integrates with toll authorities back office systems.
Patents: Patent Pending for "MOBILE DEVICE AND NAVIGATION DEVICE TOLL PAYING SYSTEM AND METHOD "
Update: In January 2016 the Central Florida Expressway began testing of the platform
Update: In July 2016 the platform was opened up to the general public for up to 1,000 users
Update: In 2023, for some unknown reason, PayTollo announced it was decommissioning the service on April 11, 2023

The Toll Roads
Application Name: The Toll Roads
Toll Authority: FastTrak
Roadways:  California
Capabilities: Gives users the ability to log into their transponder accounts and view history, add money to their balance, contact customer service, and calculate toll fees

References

External links
Peasy
PlusPass
TEXpress Website
Tollmate by NTTA
FastToll
IPass Manager
PayTollo
http://www.thetollroads.com/
Ecotoll

Car costs
Mobile software